Deven Bhojani is an Indian actor and director. He is a theatre artist, who is best known for his Gujarati plays. He made his television debut with the famous show Shankar Nag 's Malgudi Days in 1987. He mainly gained popularity for his comic roles and for playing some supporting characters. He has won three best director awards for Sarabhai vs Sarabhai, The ITA Award, The Indian Telly Award and The Apsara Award.

Early life
Bhojani is a Gujarati, born and raised in Mumbai.

Education
He has completed his schooling from Gokalibai punamchand pitamber high school, Vile Parle, Mumbai.
Bhojani completed his graduation in Commerce from SVKM's NMIMS, Mumbai. He studied film direction at the University of Southern California.

Filmography

Films

As actor

As director

Television

As actor

As director

As producer

References

External links

 
 

Living people
Gujarati people
Male actors from Mumbai
Indian male comedians
Indian male soap opera actors
Film directors from Mumbai
Indian male film actors
Indian male stage actors
Gujarati theatre
University of Southern California alumni
1969 births